Johann Carlo (born May 21, 1957) is an American actress.

Early life
Carlo was born in Buffalo, New York.

Career 
She made her Broadway debut in 1983, appearing as Louise in Plenty. In 1991, she returned to Broadway for La Bête. She was commissioned by the Whitney Museum to write, direct and perform in the musical It's Still Life, which went on to tour in India and Morocco. She has also written and acted in several performance pieces.

In 1986, she was cast as Dixie, the cabbie who introduced the King of Cartoons from Pee-wee's Playhouse. Dixie appeared only in the show's first season.

Carlo has also been seen in the TV shows Crime Story (1986), Law & Order (1991, 1997) and Chicago Hope (1995). She had a recurring role on The Sopranos (1999) as Bonnie DiCaprio.

Carlo's film debut was in 1989 as a performance artist in Merchant Ivory's Slaves of New York, singing "Say Hi to Your Guy", a song she wrote, with Michael Butler. She appeared in Reversal of Fortune (1990), Quiz Show (1994), Looking for Richard (1996), and Happiness (1998).

Filmography

Film

Television

References

External links
 
 
Cypress Films 

1957 births
American film actresses
American television actresses
Living people
Actresses from Buffalo, New York
21st-century American women